The NWA World Junior Heavyweight Championship is a professional wrestling championship owned by the Japanese Pro Wrestling Zero1 promotion.

On July 11, 2011, then-NWA World Junior Heavyweight Champion Craig Classic announced that he was relinquishing his title in protest over the National Wrestling Alliance (NWA) stripping The Sheik of the NWA World Heavyweight Championship. However, on September 20, NWA affiliate Pro Wrestling Zero1 announced that they still recognized Classic as the NWA World Junior Heavyweight Champion. When Classic returned to the promotion on October 2, he was still in possession of the NWA title belt (which used the belt worn by the original Tiger Mask, Satoru Sayama, in the 1980s), which he went on to successfully defend against Munenori Sawa. Despite this being the first appearance of the new version of the title, Zero1 went as far as adopting the original title's history, referring to Classic as the 108th champion and his defense against Sawa as his 22nd successful defense. Meanwhile, NWA crowned their own NWA World Junior Heavyweight Champion, Kevin Douglas, on October 7, meaning that there now were two champions supposedly holding the same title. That same month, Zero1 quit the NWA and renamed all of their National Wrestling Alliance championships "New Wrestling Alliance" championships.

Like most professional wrestling championships, the title is won as a result of a scripted match. There have been twenty-one reigns shared among eighteen wrestlers. The current champion is Leo Isaka who is in his first reign.

Title history

Combined reigns

See also

List of National Wrestling Alliance championships
International Junior Heavyweight Championship (Zero1)
NWA World Junior Heavyweight Championship

Footnotes

References

External links
Pro Wrestling Zero1's official website
Title history at Wrestling-Titles.com

Pro Wrestling Zero1 championships
Junior heavyweight wrestling championships
World professional wrestling championships